In 2001, it saw 2 terrorist attacks resulting over 20 deaths and 10 injuries. This was the beginning of War on Terror after the 9/11 attacks

28 October — Attack on a Protestant church in southern Punjab city of Bahawalpur resulted in 16 deaths and 6 injuries. The casualties were all Christian worshippers except one police officer.

21 December — Pakistani interior minister Lt. Gen. (retd) Moinuddin Haider's elder brother Ehteshamuddin Haider was shot dead by assailants near Soldier Bazaar in Karachi.

References 

 
2001 in Pakistan
2001